Coleophora valesianella is a moth of the family Coleophoridae. It is found in Europe south of the line running from France to Austria and Romania. It has also been recorded from Cyprus.

The larvae feed on Astragalus aristatus, Astragalus monspessulanus and Hippocrepis species. They create a white pistol case, covered with a translucent, foam-like pallium (cloak) of silken scales. The mouth angle is about 45°. Generally, the larva mines all leaflets of a leaf before moving to the next leaf. Larvae can be found from autumn to spring of the following year.

References

valesianella
Moths of Europe
Moths described in 1849